In international relations, public diplomacy or people's diplomacy, broadly speaking, is any of the various government-sponsored efforts aimed at communicating directly with foreign publics to establish a dialogue designed to inform and influence with the aim that this foreign public supports or tolerates a government's strategic objectives. These also include propaganda. As the international order has changed over the twentieth century, so has the practice of public diplomacy. Its practitioners use a variety of instruments and methods ranging from personal contact and media interviews to the Internet and educational exchanges.

Background and definitions 

In his essay "'Public Diplomacy' Before Gullion: The Evolution of a Phrase," Nicholas J. Cull of the USC Center on Public Diplomacy writes, "The earliest use of the phrase 'public diplomacy' to surface is actually not American at all but in a leader piece from the London Times in January 1856. It is used merely as a synonym for civility in a piece criticizing the posturing of President Franklin Pierce." Cull writes that Edmund Gullion, dean of the Fletcher School of Law and Diplomacy at Tufts University and a distinguished retired foreign service officer, "was the first to use the phrase in its modern meaning." In 1965, Gullion founded the Edward R. Murrow Center of Public Diplomacy, and Cull writes "An early Murrow Center brochure provided a convenient summary of Gullion's concept":

Public diplomacy . . . deals with the influence of public attitudes on the formation and execution of foreign policies. It encompasses dimensions of international relations beyond traditional diplomacy; the cultivation by governments of public opinion in other countries; the interaction of private groups and interests in one country with another; the reporting of foreign affairs and its impact on policy; communication between those whose job is communication, as diplomats and foreign correspondents; and the process of intercultural communications.

Over time, the concept and definition of public diplomacy have evolved, as demonstrated by the following statements from various practitioners:

The most important roles public diplomacy will have to play for the United States in the current international environment will be less grand-strategic and more operational than during the Cold War. Support of national policy in military contingencies is one such role, and probably the most important.
– Carnes Lord (former deputy director of USIA), professor of statecraft and civilization, October 1998

Public diplomacy – effectively communicating with publics around the globe – to understand, value and even emulate America's vision and ideas; historically one of America's most effective weapons of outreach, persuasion and policy.
– Jill A. Schuker (former senior director for public affairs at the National Security Council), July 2004

Public diplomacy's 21st century trend is dominated by fractal globalization, preemptive military invasion, information and communication technologies that shrink time and distance, and the rise of global non-state actors (terror networks, bloggers) that challenge state-driven policy and discourse on the subject.– Nancy Snow, Routledge Handbook of Public Diplomacy, 
Public diplomacy may be defined, simply, as the conduct of international relations by governments through public communications media and through dealings with a wide range of nongovernmental entities (political parties, corporations, trade associations, labor unions, educational institutions, religious organizations, ethnic groups, and so on including influential individuals) for the purpose of influencing the politics and actions of other governments.– Alan K. Henrikson, Professor of Diplomatic History, April 2005.

Public diplomacy that traditionally represents actions of governments to influence overseas publics within the foreign policy process has expanded today—by accident and design—beyond the realm of governments to include the media, multinational corporations, NGO's and faith-based organizations as active participants in the field.– Crocker Snow Jr., Acting Director Edward R. Murrow Center, May 2005.Public diplomacy refers to government-sponsored programs intended to inform or influence public opinion in other countries; its chief instruments are publications, motion pictures, cultural exchanges, radio and television.                                                                          – U.S. Department of State, Dictionary of International Relations Terms, 1987, p. 85The United States Information Agency (USIA), which was the main government agency in charge of public diplomacy until it merged with the Department of State in 1999, described it as "seek[ing] to promote the national interest and the national security of the United States through understanding, informing, and influencing foreign publics and broadening dialogue between American citizens and institutions and their counterparts abroad." For the Planning Group for Integration of USIA into the Department of State (June 20, 1997), public diplomacy meant "seek[ing] to promote the national interest of the United States through understanding, informing and influencing foreign audiences." According to Hans N. Tuch, author of Communicating With the World (St. Martin's Press, NY, 1990), public diplomacy is "official government efforts to shape the communications environment overseas in which American foreign policy is played out, in order to reduce the degree to which misperceptions and misunderstandings complicate relations between the U.S. and other nations."

Standard diplomacy might be described as the ways in which government leaders communicate with each other at the highest levels, the elite diplomacy we are all familiar with. Public diplomacy, by contrast focuses on the ways in which a country (or multilateral organization such as the United Nations) communicates with citizens in other societies. A country may be acting deliberately or inadvertently, and through both official and private individuals and institutions. Effective public diplomacy starts from the premise that dialogue, rather than a sales pitch, is often central to achieving the goals of foreign policy: public diplomacy must be seen as a two-way street. Furthermore, public diplomacy activities often present many differing views as represented by private American individuals and organizations in addition to official U.S. government views.

Traditional diplomacy actively engages one government with another government. In traditional diplomacy, U.S. Embassy officials represent the U.S. government in a host country primarily by maintaining relations and conducting official business with the officials of the host government whereas public diplomacy primarily engages many diverse non-government elements of a society.

Film, television, music, sports, video games and other social/cultural activities are seen by public diplomacy advocates as enormously important avenues for otherwise diverse citizens to understand each other and integral to the international cultural understanding, which they state is a key goal of modern public diplomacy strategy. It involves not only shaping the message(s) that a country wishes to present abroad, but also analyzing and understanding the ways that the message is interpreted by diverse societies and developing the tools of listening and conversation as well as the tools of persuasion.

One of the most successful initiatives which embodies the principles of effective public diplomacy is the creation by international treaty in the 1950s of the European Coal and Steel Community which later became the European Union. Its original purpose after World War II was to tie the economies of Europe together so much that war would be impossible. Supporters of European integration see it as having achieved both this goal and the extra benefit of catalysing greater international understanding as European countries did more business together and the ties among member states' citizens increased. Opponents of European integration are leery of a loss of national sovereignty and greater centralization of power.

Public diplomacy has been an essential element of American foreign policy for decades. It was an important tool in influencing public opinion during the Cold War with the former Soviet Union. Since the attacks of September 11, 2001, the term has come back into vogue as the United States government works to improve their reputation abroad, particularly in the Middle East and among those in the Islamic world. Numerous panels, including those sponsored by the Council on Foreign Relations, have evaluated American efforts in public diplomacy since 9/11 and have written reports recommending that the United States take various actions to improve the effectiveness of their public diplomacy.

The United States Advisory Commission on Public Diplomacy was established in the late 1940s to evaluate American public diplomacy effort. The commission is a seven-member bipartisan board whose members are nominated by the President and confirmed by the United States Senate. William Hybl is the current chair, and other members include former Ambassadors Lyndon Olson and Penne Percy Korth Peacock, as well as Jay Snyder, John E. Osborn and Lezlee Westine.

This traditional concept is expanded on with the idea of adopting what is called "population-centric foreign affairs" within which foreign populations assume a central component of foreign policy. Since people, not just states, are of global importance in a world where technology and migration increasingly face everyone, an entire new door of policy is opened.

Methods
There are many methods and instruments that are used in public diplomacy. Nicholas J. Cull divides the practice into five elements: listening, advocacy, cultural diplomacy, exchange diplomacy and international broadcasting (IB).

International broadcasting remains a key element in public diplomacy in the 21st century, with traditionally weaker states having the opportunity to challenge the hegemony and monopoly of information provided by more powerful states.

Methods such as personal contact, broadcasters such as the Voice of America, Radio Free Europe and Radio Liberty exchange programs such as Fulbright and the International Visitor Leadership Program, American arts and performances in foreign countries, and the use of the Internet are all instruments used for practicing public diplomacy depending on the audience to be communicated with and the message to be conveyed.

Impact
According to a 2021 study, high-level visits by leaders increases public approval among foreign citizens.

See also

 British Council
 Citizen diplomacy
 Cultural diplomacy
 Digital diplomacy
 Diplomatic capital
 Goethe-Institut
 Music and political warfare
 Office of Public Diplomacy
 Political warfare
 Public diplomacy of the United States
 Public diplomacy of Israel
 Public diplomacy in the Islamic Republic of Iran
 Otto Reich
 Smith–Mundt Act
 Strategic communication
 USC Center on Public Diplomacy
 United States Information Agency

References

Fallows, James (2005) "Success without Victory," The Atlantic Monthly, 295:1 p. 80 (Evera quotation)

Further reading

 Justin Hart, Empire of Ideas: The Origins of Public Diplomacy and the Transformation of US Foreign Policy. New York: Oxford University Press, 2013.
 Philip M. Taylor, "Public Diplomacy and Strategic Communications," in Nancy Snow and Philip M. Taylor (eds.), Routledge Handbook of Public Diplomacy. Routledge, 2009.
 Nancy Snow, "Rethinking Public Diplomacy," in Nancy Snow and Philip M. Taylor (eds.), Routledge Handbook of Public Diplomacy, Routledge, 2009. 
Nesterovych, Volodymyr (2015). "Foreign Broadcasting of the USA in the System of American Public Diplomacy". Viche. 7–8: 32–36.

 B. Xharra and M. Wählisch, Beyond Remittances: Public Diplomacy and Kosovo's Diaspora, Foreign Policy Club, Pristina (2012). Abstract.

External links 

 PUBLIC DIPLOMACY at Syracuse University
 Nancy Snow and Philip M. Taylor, Routledge Handbook on Public Diplomacy  
 How the World Sees America - Amar Bakshi on Washington Post/Newsweek on Public Diplomacy
Example of term being used by President George W. Bush in relation to the Middle East - January 19, 2005 The Age 
 Public Diplomacy Wiki maintained by the USC Center on Public Diplomacy
 Public Diplomacy (USIAAA)
 Journal of Place Branding and Public Diplomacy
 The Edward R. Murrow Center of Public Diplomacy at The Fletcher School
 Public Diplomacy Research Network
  The UK Foreign and Commonwealth Office collection of articles on Public Diplomacy
 Public Diplomacy Blog - India & SE Asia

 
Types of diplomacy
Propaganda
Diplomacy